The Unsworth ministry was the 79th ministry of the New South Wales Government, and was led by the 36th Premier of New South Wales, Barrie Unsworth, representing the Labor Party.

After the surprise announcement in June 1986 that Neville Wran  would retire as Premier, NSW Labor Leader, and from Parliament with effect from 4 July 1986, Unsworth, then a Member of the New South Wales Legislative Council, was elected as the leader of the NSW Labor Party and thus became Premier. However, by parliamentary convention, Premiers are members of the Legislative Assembly. In order for Unsworth to move from the Legislative Council to the Legislative Assembly, Brian Bannon, the member for Rockdale, resigned to accept a role as Chairman of the Homebush States Sport Centre Trust, and Unsworth contested the resulting by-election held on 2 August 1986. He narrowly won the seat, with a 17.1% decline in the primary vote and independent preferences giving him a margin of just 54 votes. A by-election for Wran's safe Labor seat of Bass Hill was even worse, with a 22.2 per cent decline in the primary vote delivering a 103vote victory to the Liberal candidate.

The ministry covers the period from 4 July 1986 when Unsworth was elected by Labor caucus as the NSW Labor Leader until 21 March 1988 when Labor suffered a landslide defeat at the state election by the LiberalNational coalition, led by Nick Greiner and Wal Murray. Unsworth did not contest the 1991 election.

Composition of ministry
Fifteen of the twenty ministers retained some or all of their portfolios from the eighth Wran ministry. There were two minor rearrangements of the ministry, in November 1986 with a new portfolio of Forests and in November 1987, when Laurie Brereton resigned from the ministry, triggering a reshuffle.

 
Ministers are members of the Legislative Assembly unless otherwise noted.

See also

 Members of the New South Wales Legislative Assembly, 1984–1988
Members of the New South Wales Legislative Council, 1984–1988

Notes

References

 

New South Wales ministries
1986 establishments in Australia
1988 disestablishments in Australia
Australian Labor Party ministries in New South Wales